The MotoGP Hall of Fame is the hall of fame of Grand Prix motorcycle racing. Its members are called MotoGP Legends.

Since its inception in 2000, 36 racers have been inducted by FIM, including both the most successful world champions such as Giacomo Agostini, Ángel Nieto, Mike Hailwood and Carlo Ubbiali, as well as champions who had died young such as Jarno Saarinen and Daijiro Kato. The latest inductee is Hugh Anderson.

MotoGP Legends
Out of the 36 racers who have been inducted, Mamola is the only inductee who never won a single championship in his career. Nicky Hayden and Dani Pedrosa are the only MotoGP Legends to have started a race in MotoGP after being inducted in the Hall of Fame.

References

External links
MotoGP Legends

Grand Prix motorcycle racing
Auto racing museums and halls of fame
2000 establishments
Sports organizations established in 2000